The Žebřík Music Awards (also known as Music Ladder Awards) is a Czech awards show organized by music and style magazine iReport to honor the best artists in Czech Republic and internationally. It was first held in 1993 to announce the winners of their 1992 poll, following the same pattern ever since. The ceremony is usually held every year at Plzeň's DEPO2015, except in 2020 due to the COVID-19 pandemic, which led winners from both 2019 and 2020 polls to be reported in 2021.

Categories 
The Žebřík Music Awards are divided into two parts: domestic and foreign. Winners and nominees for each category are decided by the public through SMS or by filling a voting form in the iReport website. The first round goes from January 1 to 31 and results in five nominees in ten categories, while the second round takes place from February 1 to 28 and determines the final ranking in each category.

References

External links